The Bundesrat ("Federal Council") of the North German Confederation and the German Empire was the highest legislative body in Germany. It existed from 1867 to 1918. Until the 1902 spelling reform, its name was spelled Bundesrath.

The Bundesrat comprised representatives of the 25 member states (Bundesstaaten). The numbers of votes of each state were specified in the imperial constitution.

The representatives of the states voted as directed by their governments. The chairmanship of the  Bundesrat was held by the Imperial Chancellor. All laws passed in Germany had to have the support of the Bundesrat. Also, certain official procedures carried out by the Kaiser had to be voted on, for example, the dissolution of the Reichstag and declarations of war. The Bundesrat ruled on Reichsexekutions; besides, it had numerous administrative functions and the power to adjudicate disputes between the states and, in certain cases, to resolve constitutional disputes within a state. An Imperial Supreme Court, unlike that of the Constitution of St. Paul's Church, was not envisaged in the Imperial Constitution as an independent body, rather jurisdiction lay with the German Emperor and King of Prussia.

The Bundesrat was, in practice, dominated by Prussia. It had a plurality of 17 votes in the chamber; no other state had more than six votes. It could control the proceedings by forming alliances with the other states. Additionally, Bismarck served as both prime minister and foreign minister of Prussia for almost his entire tenure. In the latter capacity, he had the right to instruct the Prussian deputies to the Bundesrat.

Although constitutionally the highest organ of state power, the Bundesrat was pushed into the background by the Kaiser and the Reich Chancellor due to the simple fact that the Prussian minister-president often held the office of Chancellor simultaneously and was thus chairman of the Bundesrat.

For changes to the constitution, a proposal had to go through the normal legislative process. That said, it only needed 14 votes in the Bundesrat to vote down such a proposal. That meant that Prussia, with its 17 votes, effectively had a right of veto over constitutional changes.

Distribution of votes

External links 

Politics of the German Empire
1871 establishments in Germany
1918 disestablishments in Germany